Johann Dubez (1828 – 27 October 1891) was an Austrian  composer and virtuoso of mandolin, guitar, harp and zither.

Life
Dubez was born and died in Vienna, Austria, of Italian extraction, according to J. Powrozniak . His father was a weaver and young Johann Dubez grew up in Neulerchenfeld, a suburb of Vienna. In 1846, he was engaged as violinist in the Josefstadt Theatre, Vienna, and formed there an acquaintance with the guitar virtuoso Giulio Regondi. Dubez, who frequently heard Regondi perform when the latter appeared in Vienna, was so fascinated that he adopted the guitar, too, and studied it under Regondi and Johann Kaspar Mertz in this city. His progress was very rapid for in 1847 he gave his first guitar concert in the old Vienna Academy of Music, playing Regondi's compositions and meeting with enormous success.

Dubez was a brilliant harpist, too, and under Giacomo Meyerbeer's baton he played the well-known harp solo in the opera Vielka. Some few years previous to his death he undertook a protracted concert tour, visiting Bucharest and Constantinople. In the former city he was commanded to perform before the Queen of Romania, and in the latter before the Sultan and Court, receiving the decoration of the Medjidia Order. Dubez was elected the first president of the Vienna Zither Society, founded in 1875, and also created honorary member of the Prague Zither Society.

Music
Dubez's guitar compositions are written in a similar style as those of his teacher, Mertz, but the majority remain in manuscript. He has also composed several harp solos, published by Spina, Bösendorfer, and Cranz of Hamburg, Germany. Dubez's portrait was published by the Vienna Zither Society's Journal in 1891. As a guitarist, he takes rank with Mertz and Regondi, and was one of the most celebrated of Austrian virtuosi.

Among his published compositions there are a Fantasia on Hungarian Melodies for guitar, issued by Diabelli and Co., Vienna. His opus numbers 11, 33, 34, 35 and 37 are harp solos, which were published by Cranz, Hamburg.

Works
Fantasia on Hungarian Themes
Da Himmel (arr.)
Neulerchenfelder Salon-Töne (1857)
Divertissement sur des motifs de l'opéra 'La Sonnambula''' Divertissement sur des motifs de l'opéra 'Ernani'Deux Chansons sans paroles'' op. 33 for harp

References

1828 births
1891 deaths
19th-century classical composers
19th-century male musicians
Austrian classical guitarists
Male guitarists
Austrian male classical composers
Austrian mandolinists
Austrian Romantic composers
Composers for harp
Composers for the classical guitar
19th-century guitarists